Pardus  may refer to:

 Saint Pardus, patron saint of Larino, Italy
 Dan Pardus, an American NASCAR driver
 Pardus (operating system), a Linux distribution developed in Turkey
 Pardus (video game), graphical browser-based MMORPG
 Pardus, Pennsylvania, a community in the United States

Biology
 Panthera pardus, the scientific name for the leopard
 Panthera pardus pardus, African leopard
 Pseudophilautus pardus is an extinct species of Sri Lankan shrub frogs, in the family Rhacophoridae
 Ecsenius pardus, a species of blenny, a fish of the family Blenniidae
 Cystiscus pardus is a species of very small sea snail, a marine gastropod mollusk or micromollusk in the family Cystiscidae.
 Jorunna pardus, a species of sea slug in the family Discodorididae.